Feivel Schiffer (1809–1871) was a Polish maskilic poet and writer.

He was born in Lasezow and raised in the district of Zamość. He lived successively in Josefov, Brody, and Szebrszyn before settling in Warsaw in 1835, where he opened a private school for Jewish children. Schiffer's first major publication was Ḥatzerot ha-Shir, an epic poem on the life of the patriarch Jacob (Warsaw, 1840).

In 1843 he published Matta Leshem, an idyll on agriculture and country life in poetic prose. Schiffer advocated for a transition to agriculture among Polish Jews, and helped settle Jews on land near Zamość with the financial backing of Prince Ivan Paskevich. As an expression of gratitude, Schiffer published Davar Gevorot (Warsaw, 1845), a biography of Paskevich in Hebrew.

He later published Toledot Napoleon, a biography of Napoléon Bonaparte from a pro-Russian point of view, in two parts (Warsaw, 1849 and 1857). The work was one of the first books in Hebrew on general history. His final publication was Mehalkhim im Anashim, a translation of Adolph Freiherr Knigge's  (Warsaw, 1866).

References

External links
 Works of Feivel Schiffer at the Online Books Page

19th-century biographers
1809 births
1871 deaths
Hebrew-language poets
Hebrew-language writers
Male biographers
Polish biographers
19th-century Polish Jews
Translators to Hebrew
19th-century translators